In the field of streaming algorithms, Misra–Gries summaries are used to solve the frequent elements problem in the data stream model. That is, given a long stream of input that can only be examined once (and in some arbitrary order), the Misra-Gries algorithm can be used to compute which (if any) value makes up a majority of the stream, or more generally, the set of items that constitute some fixed fraction of the stream.

The term "summary" is due to Graham Cormode. The algorithm is also called the Misra–Gries heavy hitters algorithm.

The Misra–Gries summary 

As for all algorithms in the data stream model, the input is a finite sequence of integers from a finite domain. The algorithm outputs an associative array which has values from the stream as keys, and estimates of their frequency as the corresponding values. It takes a parameter  which determines the size of the array, which impacts both the quality of the estimates and the amount of memory used.

 algorithm misra-gries:
     input: 
         A positive integer 
         A finite sequence  taking values in the range 1,2,...,
     output: An associative array  with frequency estimates for each item in 
     
      := new (empty) associative array
     while  is not empty:
         take a value  from 
         if  is in keys():
             [] := [i] + 1
         else if |keys()| <  - 1:
             [] := 1
         else:
             for each  in keys():
                 [] := [] - 1
                 if [] = 0:
                     remove  from keys()
     return

Properties 

The factor  accounts for the number of entries that are kept in the associative array . Each entry consists of a value  and an associated counter . The counter  can, in principle, take any value in {0,...,}, which requires ⌈log(+1)⌉ bits to store. Assuming that the values  are integers in {0,...,-1}, storing them requires ⌈log()⌉ bits.

Every item which occurs more than / times is guaranteed to appear in the output array. Therefore, in a second pass over the data, the exact frequencies for the −1 items can be computed to solve the frequent items problem, or in the case of =2, the majority problem. With the same arguments as above, this second pass also takes O((log()+log())) space.

Example 

Let k=2 and the data stream be 1,4,5,4,4,5,4,4 (n=8,m=5). Note that 4 is appearing 5 times in the data stream which is more than n/k=4 times and thus should appear as the output of the algorithm.

Since k=2 and |keys(A)|=k−1=1 the algorithm can only have one key with its corresponding value.  The algorithm will then execute as follows(- signifies that no key is present):

Output: 4

References 

Streaming algorithms